MycoKeys is a peer-reviewed open access scientific journal covering mycology. It was established in 2011 by Pensoft Publishers. The editor-in-chief is H. Thorsten Lumbsch.

Abstracting and indexing 
The journal is abstracted and indexed in:
 Science Citation Index Expanded.
 Current Contents/Agriculture, Biology & Environmental Sciences.
 BIOSIS Previews.
According to the Journal Citation Reports, the journal has a 2021 impact factor of 3.111.

References

External links 
 

Systematics journals
Publications established in 2011
Creative Commons Attribution-licensed journals
English-language journals
Pensoft Publishers academic journals